Naomi Maxfield Shumway (October 3, 1922 – May 22, 2004 ) was the sixth general president of the Primary organization of the Church of Jesus Christ of Latter-day Saints (LDS Church) from 1974 to 1980.

Naomi Maxfield was born in Provo, Utah. She married Roden Grant Shumway.

In 1963, Shumway became a member of the general board of the Primary Association. In 1974, Shumway was selected to succeed LaVern W. Parmley as general president of the organization. Parmley had been the president of the Primary for 23 years. Shumway served until 1980, when she was succeeded by Dwan J. Young.

During Shumway’s tenure, the Primary celebrated the 100th anniversary of its founding in 1878 by Aurelia Spencer Rogers. In 1980, Shumway and her counselors approved of a plan to end Primary on weekdays and to incorporate it into the LDS Church’s three-hour Sunday worship services. However, the implementation of this plan was left to Shumway’s successor, Dwan J. Young.

In the early 1990s, Shumway was selected to write the entry for Primary for Macmillan’s Encyclopedia of Mormonism.

References 
 Arnold K. Garr, Donald Q. Cannon & Richard O. Cowan (eds.) (2000).  Encyclopedia of Latter-day Saint History (Salt Lake City, Utah: Deseret Book)
 Carol Cornwall Madsen and Susan Staker Oman. (1978). Sisters and Little Saints: One Hundred Years of Primary (Salt Lake City, Utah: Deseret Book)
 Janet Peterson and LaRene Gaunt (1996). The Children's Friends: Presidents of the Primary and Their Lives of Service (Salt Lake City, Utah: Deseret Book)
"New Presidency Sustained for Primary", Ensign, November 1974.

1922 births
2004 deaths
American Latter Day Saint writers
American leaders of the Church of Jesus Christ of Latter-day Saints
General Presidents of the Primary (LDS Church)
Latter Day Saints from Utah
Writers from Provo, Utah